The Superstars International Series was a production-based touring car racing championship held between 2004 and 2013. It was managed by the "Superstars World of Racing SpA", SWR, a company of FG GROUP with headquarters in Rome and sanctioned by the Automobile Club d'Italia (ACI) and the Commissione Sportiva Automobilistica Italiana (CSAI). FG GROUP, led by Maurizio Flammini, is famous for having promoted the FIM World Superbike Championship from its beginnings in 1988 until its sale to Infront Sports & Media in 2007.

After the shutdown of the promoter SWR in late 2013, the competition has been re-branded as EuroV8 Series and organized by FG Group and ATT (Associazione Team Top cars). SuperTouringSeries is going to be performed by Pan Asia Racing Enterprise Ltd. (PARE Ltd) in 2015. However, it has been cancelled.

The new championship’s identity, partners, teams, sporting regulations and calendar was unveiled at the Autosport International show in January 2014.

History
The series began in 2004 as Trofeo Nazionale Superstars (Superstars National Trophy) with a six race schedule, all the events held in Italian tracks. The initial field was made of BMW M5 and Jaguar S-Type models, entered by five teams.

Since 2005 the series earned the Campionato Italiano Superstars (Italian Superstars Championship) title, and soon became the main tin-top auto racing series of the country, replacing the Italian Superturismo Championship (folded in 2007).

In 2007 the series started to visit circuits in other European countries with the FIA approved International Superstars Series. Since then every season awards two different drivers' titles, one for the International Series and one for the Italian Championship. Points are gained for the Italian Championship at each Italian and one European race meeting.

With the 2010 season a new series was added, the International GTSprint Series allowing GT2, GT3 and nationally-homologated GTs. Uniquely, however, it has two 25 minute sprint events per weekend rather than the usual two-driver, long-distance runs that are the norm in GT competition.

The 2012 season saw the growth of the series in terms of media and spectators - attracting 33,000 fans to its race at Vallelunga in Rome on October 7, 2012. Johan Kristoffersson won the championship in his KMS Audi RS5 after a season long battle with Vitantonio Liuzzi and his CAAL Racing Mercedes AMG C63. Kristoffersson's success in Superstars proved a strong element in advancing his career.

The 2013 calendar contains eight races in 6 countries. The series promoters have given the series an umbrella name "The Superstars World of Racing" that reflects its international growth and refers to the entire weekend of events which includes The Superstars International Series, the GT Sprint International Series, local support races and entertainment events.

Format and philosophy

Since 2009 the Series has run a two sprint race format. Race 1 to take place Sunday morning and Race 2 to take place Sunday afternoon.

The technical regulations are designed to bring the largest touring cars together in a balanced competition that limits costs, maximizes spectacle and limits driver assistance.  A total of 10 brands will be represented in the 2013 edition: Audi RS5, BMW M3, Cadillac CTS-V, Chevrolet Lumina and Camaro, Chrysler 300C SRT8, Jaguar XF, Lexus ISF, Maserati Quattroporte, Mercedes C63AMG, Porsche Panamera.

Technical regulations

Current season
The 2013 Superstars championships are reserved for production-based saloon cars with the following basic characteristics:
Otto cycle engines with 6 to 12 cylinders (Wankel engines not allowed)
forced induction (turbochargers or superchargers) allowed if used in the production car
minimum displacement of 3800 cc
production H-pattern gearbox or approved mechanical sequential gearbox (automatic and semiautomatic transmission are forbidden)
four or two doors body style
homologated for at least 4 passengers
Each homologated car must comply with a technical sheet issued by the Permanent Bureau, which contains the technical description of all the car's components, both originals and belonging to technical kits.

Eligible cars

Note: Chevrolet Lumina CR8 is a badge engineering of HSV Clubsport R8.

Expired homologations
Cars no longer eligible:

Sporting regulations

Scoring system
The scoring system has been revised for 2009 season.

Since 2012 an additional point is awarded to every driver in the starting grid of each race.

Champions
 Superstars Series

 EuroV8 Series

Trophies
 Superstars Series

Media coverage

Television coverage
In 2012 the Superstars Series received live and as-live broadcast in 103 countries with total distribution reaching 195 territories. The 2012 TV media value, as per data from wige and sport+Markt, was €56 million.

Video games
In 2009, the championship made its video game debut Superstars V8 Racing which features the 2008 championship. A sequel named Superstars V8 Next Challenge was released in February 2010, featuring the 2009 season.

See also
Italian Superturismo Championship

References

External links
 

 
Touring car racing series
Recurring sporting events established in 2004
Recurring sporting events disestablished in 2013
Defunct auto racing series
2004 establishments in Italy
2013 disestablishments in Italy